On 17 August 1999, a catastrophic magnitude 7.6 earthquake struck the Kocaeli Province of Turkey, causing monumental damage and 17,127–18,373 deaths. Named for the quake’s proximity to the northwestern city of İzmit, the earthquake is also commonly referred to as the 17 August Earthquake or the 1999 Gölcük Earthquake. The earthquake occurred at 03:01 local time (00:01 UTC) at a shallow depth of 15 km. A maximum Mercalli intensity of X (Extreme) was observed. The earthquake lasted for 37 seconds, causing seismic damage and is widely remembered as one of the deadliest natural disasters in modern Turkish history.

The 1999 earthquake was part of a seismic sequence along the North Anatolian Fault that started in 1939, causing large earthquakes that moved progressively from east to west over a period of 60 years. The earthquake encouraged the establishment of a so-called earthquake tax aimed at providing assistance to the ones affected by the damages of earthquake.

Tectonic setting
The North Anatolian Fault Zone (NAFZ), which the quake occurred on is a  dextral (right-lateral) strike-slip fault zone, expanding from the Gulf of Saros to Karlıova that formed around 13—11 million years ago in the eastern part of Anatolia and moved towards the west. The fault later reached the Marmara Sea at around 200,000 years ago, despite the shear-related movement in a rather broad zone which had already started in late Miocene. 

The fault zone has a diverse geomorphological structure, is seismically active and currently stands as one of the world's most major and active strike-slip fault, having an entire group of ruptures being produced as large as 8.0 on the moment magnitude scale. Since the 17th century, it has shown cyclical behavior, with century-long large earthquake cycles beginning in the east and continuing westward. Although the record is less clear for earlier times, lively seismicity could still be seen in that timespan. The 20th century earthquake record has been interpreted as where every earthquake concentrates the stress at the western tips of the ruptured areas leading to westward migration of larger earthquakes. The August 17 and November 12, 1999 events have loaded the Marmara segment of the fault, and another major, up to magnitude 7.6 event was expected in the half-century 2005-2055 with a probability of 50% on this segment. Currently, the deformation of the rocks by stress in the Marmara Sea region is asymmetric. This is conditioned by the geology of the region and it is believed that this is the case for most of the North Anatolian Fault Zone.

Earthquake

The 17 August 1999 earthquake was the 7th in a sequence of westward-migrating quake sequence on the North Anatolian Fault. This earthquake sequence began in 1939 and ruptured along a 1000-km part of the fault zone, with horizontal displacements of up to 7.5 m.

The maximum observed ground motion was 0.45g. The earthquake lasted 35–45 seconds according to various sources. The closest cities damaged or affected by the earthquake were İzmit, Gölcük, Yalova, and Adapazarı, all located near the eastern end of the Marmara Sea, within the Gulf of İzmit. The earthquake also caused serious damage in Istanbul, especially in the district of Avcılar which is located in the western part of the city, around 70 km away from the epicenter. Despite the distance, it killed about 1,000 people in the district. The preliminary magnitude of the earthquake was 7.4 by the U.S. Geological Survey (USGS) and by the Kandilli Observatory, which operate in this country. The earthquake caused a surface rupture which consisted of four segments; Hersek/Karamürsel–Gölcük, İzmit–Lake Sapanca, Lake Sapanca–Akyazı, Akyazı–Gölyaka and Gölyaka–Düzce segments which in total, had length of more than 125 km. All the segments are separated by pull-apart stepovers of 1 to 4 km in width. The maximum offset throughout the rupture was measured on the Sapanca–Akyazı segment where the surface break displaced a road and a tree line by 5.2 m. It also showed pure strike-slip, and the fault plane is almost vertical in most of the places where a surface break was observed. Most of the major aftershocks (M>4) were located near Düzce, south of Adapazarı, in Sapanca, in İzmit, and the Çınarcık area. At Değirmendere, a small coastal town west of Gölcük, the rupture cut the edge of a fan delta where the center of the town was located, which caused a slump measuring 300 m long and 100 m wide, as a result a part of the town center slid under the water, including a hotel and several shops and restaurants. At another fan delta east of Gölcük, which is within the step-over area of the ruptures, the fault produced a 2 m-high normal fault scarp.

Data was used from seven broadband stations as well as some other short-period stations across the area to calculate the regional moment tensor of the mainshocks and larger aftershocks and as a result most of the earthquakes were found to be split in segments with the moment tensor's focal mechanism reading either a strike-slip on the fault which is west-east striking or normal faulting which is between rupture segments which also proves that the main characteristic of the quake is dextral strike-slip.

From the timing of P-wave and S-wave arrivals at seismometers, there is strong evidence that the rupture propagated eastwards from the epicenter at speeds in excess of the S-wave velocity, making this a supershear earthquake.

Impacts

There was destruction caused in Yalova as a result of the earthquake, as well as hundreds killed and many buildings collapsed. Despite the earthquake being felt very strong there, the cause of most of the damage is suspected to be the induced liquefaction in the area. Since the area is mostly made of Quaternary alluvial soil which means it is rather prone to liquefaction, has around 200 drilling sites and boreholes and has many streams or rivers nearby, severe liquefaction was induced and recorded.

Destruction in Istanbul was concentrated in the Avcılar district. Avcılar was built on relatively weak ground, mainly composed of poorly consolidated Cenozoic sedimentary rocks, which makes this district vulnerable to any earthquake.

An official Turkish estimate dated 19 October 1999 placed the toll at 17,127 killed and 43,953 injured, but many sources suggest the actual figure may have been closer to 45,000 dead and a similar number injured. Reports from September 1999 show that 120,000 poorly engineered houses were damaged beyond repair and approximately 20,000 buildings collapsed, resulting in more than 250,000 people becoming homeless after the earthquake. About 60 Km of the Istanbul-Ankara highway, almost 500 Km electricity cables and over 3000 electricity distribution towers were damaged. 

Private contractors faced backlash for using cheap materials in their construction of residential buildings. Many of these contractors were prosecuted but few were found guilty. Government officials also faced backlash for not properly enforcing earthquake resistant building codes. Direct cost of damages is estimated at $6.5 billion US dollars, but secondary costs could exceed $20 billion. In 2010, the research branch of the Grand National Assembly of Turkey released a report stating the amount of casualties as 18,373. In the same report, they have stated that there have been 48,901 injured, 505 permanently injured, 96,796 homes heavily damaged or destroyed, 15,939 businesses heavily damaged or destroyed, 107,315 homes moderately damaged, 16,316 businesses moderately damaged, 113,382 homes slightly damaged, 14,657 businesses slightly damaged, 40,786 prefabricated homes were distributed and 147,120 people were placed into the prefab homes.

There was extensive damage to several bridges and other structures on the Trans-European Motorway (European route E80), including 20 viaducts, 5 tunnels, and some overpasses. Damage ranged from spalling concrete to total deck collapse.

Oil refinery fire

The earthquake sparked a disastrous fire at the Tüpraş petroleum refinery. The fire began at a state-owned tank farm and was initiated by naphtha that had spilled from a holding tank. Breakage in water pipelines, results of the quake, nullified attempts at extinguishing the fire. Aircraft were called in to douse the flames with foam. The fire spread over the next few days, warranting the evacuation of the area within three miles (about 5km) of the refinery. The fire was declared under control five days later after claiming at least seventeen tanks and untold amounts of complex piping.

Due to the fire, people within two to three miles of the refinery needed to evacuate even though some areas were still in the process of search and rescue.

Tsunami
Many field studies were made about the tsunami associated with the earthquake, especially in the Gulf of İzmit. Along the northern coast of the gulf, in the basin between Hereke and Tüpraş Petroleum Refinery, the tsunami was like a leading depression wave. The first row of waves arrived on the north coast of the gulf a few minutes after the earthquake, and had a period of around a minute. The hardest hit areas were Şirinyalı, Kirazlıyalı, Yarımca, Körfez, and the refinery. The tsunami tide carried mussels into buildings and damaged doors and windows. There were clear watermarks on the walls of buildings including the police station in Hereke, and at a restaurant near Körfez. Locals reported that the first waves arrived at Kirazlıyalı from a southeastern direction and at Körfez from a southern direction. The tsunami was recorded as a leading depression wave to the west of Kavaklı up to Güzelyalı as well. There, the wave was noticed by locals right after the earthquake. There was severe coastal subsidence as well as slumping of a park near Değirmendere. The subsided area was  along the shore and  perpendicular to shore. The same area included two piers, a hotel, a restaurant, a cafe and several trees.

The tsunami caused damage to the naval base nearby. At least 155 deaths were associated with the tsunami.

Response

A massive international response was mounted to assist in digging for survivors and to assist the wounded and homeless. Rescue teams were dispatched within 24–48 hours of the disaster, and the assistance to the survivors was channeled through NGOs, Turkish Red Crescent and local search and rescue organizations.

The following table shows the breakdown of rescue teams by country in the affected locations:

Search and Rescue Effort as of 19 August 1999. Source: USAID

In total, rescue teams from 12 countries assisted in the rescue effort. Greece was the first nation to pledge aid and support. Within hours of the earthquake, the Greek Ministry of Foreign Affairs contacted their counterparts in Turkey, and the minister sent his personal envoys to Turkey. The Ministry of Public Orders sent in a rescue team of 24 people and two trained rescue dogs, as well as fire-extinguishing planes to help with putting out the fire in the Tüpraş Oil refinery.

Oil Spill Response Limited was activated by BP to deploy from the United Kingdom to the Tüpraş Refinery where their responders successfully contained the previously uncontrolled discharge of oil from the site into the sea.

The UK announced an immediate grant of £50,000 to help the Turkish Red Crescent, while the International Red Cross and Red Crescent pledged £4.5 million to help victims. Blankets, medical supplies and food were flown from Stansted airport. Engineers from Thames Water went to help restore water supplies.

US President Bill Clinton later visited Istanbul and İzmit to examine the level of destruction and meet with the survivors.

Future risk
There has been an increased seismic activity in the Eastern Sea of Marmara since 2002 and a quiescence of earthquakes on the Princes' Islands Segment of the North Anatolian Fault off the southern coast of Istanbul. This suggests that the 150-km long submarine seismic gap below the Sea of Marmara could point out to a future, large earthquake. These possibilities are quite important, with respect to the segmentation of major fault ruptures along the North Anatolian Fault Zone in north-western Turkey. With the possible activation of segments towards the metropolitan areas of Istanbul, the Princes' Islands gap should be considered to have an impact on the large seismic hazard potential for Istanbul.

Despite a long-term earthquake catalogue existing for the North Anatolian Fault Zone and for the Istanbul area in particular, the basic understanding of the seismicity there is still a long way off. The observation of a seismic gap in vicinity to the Istanbul metropolitan area was made possible through deploying a dense network of seismic stations and small arrays near the fault trace south of the Princes' Islands. This improved monitoring along the Princes' Islands segment, which is west of the İzmit 1999 rupture and southeast of Istanbul's city center is highlighting the location of likely rupture points for the pending Marmara earthquake. It also limits the maximum size of future events along the whole Marmara seismic gap in case of cascade behavior. Knowing this, the need of a regional earthquake early warning system for Istanbul and surroundings could be justified. The aseismic part of the Princes' Islands segment could represent a potential and likely high-slip area in a future, large earthquake. Fault characterization is likewise very relevant to determine the directivity of earthquake waves approaching Istanbul. Recently made modelling of potential impacts to Istanbul from different scenarios have shown to improve the estimation of hazards the seismic gaps pose. In a similar way, more improved and dense seismic monitoring is expected from on-going efforts to install an underground (borehole-based) seismograph network in the eastern Sea of Marmara region.

Istanbul, being the most populated city in Turkey, lies right near the segments of the North Anatolian Fault Zone, making it at very high risk to an earthquake disaster which could possibly cause thousands of casualties and severe damage. Following the large earthquake in 1999, there was a great urgency for the government to mitigate these risks.  With the help of organizations like the World Bank, hundreds of buildings have been retrofitted and reconstructed, and thousands of citizens have been trained in disaster preparedness.

Gallery

See also

1999 Düzce earthquake
List of earthquakes in 1999
List of earthquakes in Turkey
Yalova Earthquake Monument
2023 Turkey–Syria earthquake

References

External links

 M7.6 - western Turkey – United States Geological Survey
 17 August 1999 Kocaeli Earthquake – The European Association for Earthquake Engineering
 Initial Geotechnical Observations of the August 17, 1999, Izmit Earthquake – National Information Service for Earthquake Engineering
 
 

1999 earthquakes
1999 in Turkey
1999 tsunamis
August 1999 events in Turkey
1999 Izmit
History of Düzce Province
History of Istanbul Province
1999 earthquake
History of Kocaeli Province
History of Sakarya Province
History of Yalova Province
Supershear earthquakes
Tsunamis in Turkey
Strike-slip earthquakes
1999 disasters in Turkey